John Taihuttu (18 November 1954 – 17 January 2016) was a Dutch professional football player of Moluccan-Indonesian origin.

Club career
A pacy winger, Taihuttu spent his professional football career at FC VVV, except for a half season loan spell at Fortuna Sittard in 1985. Dutch football commentator Theo Koomen famously nicknamed him Winnetou after a speedy run by the long haired forward resembled him of the historic Indian chief.

By the time of his death, Taihuttu was 19th on VVV's all-time top goalscorers list with 36.

Personal life and death
His younger brother Jerry Taihuttu and his son Gino also played professionally.

Taihuttu later became youth coach at Fortuna and coached SV Blerick until his death. He died of cancer in January 2016.

References

1954 births
2016 deaths
Footballers from Venlo
Dutch people of Moluccan descent
Association football wingers
Dutch footballers
Dutch people of Indonesian descent
VVV-Venlo players
Fortuna Sittard players
Eredivisie players
Eerste Divisie players